Hasb-e-Haal is a Pakistani Urdu-language comedy show based on political satire that airs on Dunya TV at 11:05 pm from Thursday to Sunday. It stars Sohail Ahmed, Junaid Saleem, Amanat Chan, Nawaz Anjum, Jiya Dilnawaz, Zulfi Ali and Goga Ji. It was first hosted by Aftab Iqbal as an anchor, Najia Baig as the co-anchor and Sohail Ahmed as a guest.

Sohail Ahmed was awarded the Presidential Pride of Performance award by Asif Zardari on 23 March 2011 for his performance on the show.

Concept
Hasb-e-Haal is a comedy program that offers commentary and satire on current affairs. Sohail Ahmed plays the character of a lower-middle-class man who is frequently reprimanded by Junaid Saleem because of his broad generalizations and over-simplification of complex political issues. Jiya Dilnawaz offers queues for laugh lines and reads viewer's comments in the show.

Cast 

Host
 "Junaid Saleem" (2010 continue)
“Guests”
 Sohail Ahmed as Azizi
 Amanat Chan as Ghauri
 Nawaz Anjum as Thayla 
 Goga Ji
 Jia Dilnawaz

Former members
 Aftab Iqbal (2009-2010)
 Najia Baig (2009-2016)

Segments

There are different segments such as:

 Adabparay
 Bait Baazi
 Hasb e Mazzi
 Hasb e Daak
 Interview
 Khabron par Tabsara
 Lamha e Fuqriya
 Tasweeron aur videos par tabsara 
 Mukhbariyaan
 Off-Beat Hasb-e-Haal
 Parodies
 Siasi Film
 Tu Tu Main Main
 Yad e Maazi

Parodies
Sohail Ahmed usually dresses up like politicians, cricketers or other celebrities and imitates them. This imitation mostly is in the form of a parody. He also plays other characters.
Feeqa
Feeqa, portrayed by Sohail Ahmed, belongs to a white-collar family which has trouble making ends meet. The character sheds light on the plight of the lower class of Pakistan. The usual topics discussed are relatives' weddings, and rituals.
PQN
PQN, short for Pervaiz Qaiser Naseer, is a corrupt politician who would do anything to come into power. The usual topics discussed are elections, and processions.
Deemah
Deemah is an ordinary man who is perpetually sick with multiple diseases.
ZVS
A fashion designer, who keeps heaping praises on his talent. He is a modern fashion designer with a gay attitude.
Witchcraft & Aalim Baba
Sohail Ahmed plays a spurious "Aalim" who, according to his rants, is the master of witches and spirits. 
Master Majeed
A teacher.
Abdul Ghafoor Jimmy
A Pakistani who lives abroad and is concerned about the security situation of Pakistan.
Azizi's Investigation News
Azizi presents a parody news program which investigates secrets and misdeeds of politicians.
Mr. Michael
This character is an American agent who overuses the catchphrase "kadu saday paise" ("give back our money"). This satirical character denigrates the Pakistani society for asking for American money despite thinking of America as an enemy.
 Nadamat
A die-hard supporter of a fictional politician, Changezi.
 Sureelay Khan
A classical singer, often accompanied by Dabbay Khan and Hamnawa.
 Policeman (SHO Siddique)
SHO parodies problems and issues affecting police forces, especially corruptions.
 Petrol station attendant
Azizi takes on the disguise of a local petrol station attendant to highlight the problems with the trade.
 Nomi
A student who never passes his exams. He usually appears after the announcement of annual results by the Federal Board.
 TV Viewer Nazir Malik
A man who wastes his time in watching tv all day.

Politicians 

Mustafa Kamal
Raja Riaz
Chaudhry Shujaat Hussain
Shahi Syed
Shah Mehmood Qureshi
Maulana Fazlur Rehman
Firdous Ashiq Awan
Javed Hashmi
 Mir Hazar Khan Khoso
 Jahangir Badar
 Yousaf Raza Gillani
Asfandyar Wali Khan
 Sheikh Rasheed
Nawaz Sharif
Shahbaz Sharif
Imran Khan
Asif Ali Zardari
Mustafa Kamal
Donald Trump
Maula Baksh Chandio
Queen Elizabeth
Ishratul Ibad
Daniyal Aziz
Najam Sethi
Chaudhry Sarwar
Farooq Sattar
Pervaiz Rasheed
Khursheed Shah
Rana Sanaullah
Barack Obama
Narendra Modi
Ubaid Malik

Azizi's fictitious friends
The following are mentioned by Azizi as his friends:
 Aroo Grenade
 Naeema Kainchi
 Tufail Thaila
 Unaid Daal Chawal
 Aslam Churra
 Ghauri

History 
Hasb-e-Haal was launched on 9 January 2009. Its idea basically comes from the old shows  "Jamhoor Di Awaaz" and "Nizam Din Di Baithak". Aftab Iqbal used to host the show at that time. The show was an instant hit.  In April 2010, Iqbal left the show due to undisclosed reasons.

Cultural effect 
Due to the popularity of the show, several similar shows emerged. These include Khabarnaak on Geo TV, Khabardaar on Express News,  3 Idiots on Aaj TV, Masti Gate on ARY News, Mazaaq Raat on Dunya News and News Night on Din News.

References

External links 
 Hasb e Haal's official website
 Hasb-e-Haal on Facebook

Dunya News original programming
Urdu-language television shows
Pakistani television series